Sir Charles Marcus Mander, 3rd Baronet (22 September 1921 – 9 August 2006) was an industrialist, property developer, landowner and farmer. He was known as Marcus Mander to his family and friends.

Biography 
Charles Marcus Mander was the only son of Charles Arthur Mander, second baronet, by Monica Neame, of Kent, born at Kilsall Hall, Tong, Shropshire. He was educated at Wellesley House School, Eton College and Trinity College, Cambridge, but did not complete his degree following the outbreak of war.

After officer training at the Royal Military College, Sandhurst, he was commissioned in the Coldstream Guards in World War II, serving as a captain in North Africa, Belgium, Germany and Italy where, following the Salerno landings, he was gravely wounded in the fierce fighting at Calabritto on the slopes of Monte Camino, in October 1943.

From 1945, he was a director of Mander Brothers, the family paint, property and inks conglomerate, founded in Wolverhampton in 1773. He was soon responsible for its property portfolio, and promoted the redevelopment of the centre of Wolverhampton, where in 1968 the Mander Centre and Mander Square were established on the site of the Georgian family works. Sir Charles was High Sheriff of Staffordshire in 1962-63 before two City posts with property groups, first as chairman of Arlington Securities (sold to British Aerospace) and then as chairman of London & Cambridge Investments. He also developed a township for 11,500 people at Perton outside Wolverhampton on the family agricultural estate, which had been requisitioned as an airfield during World War II.

In the year 2000, he sold the mansion house and part of his estate at Little Barrow, Donnington, near Moreton-in-Marsh, Gloucestershire, it is believed to meet underwriting losses at the Lloyd's insurance market after Lady Mander had been offered a settlement by Lloyd's, but refused, which resulted in her being declared bankrupt.

Sir Charles converted to Roman Catholicism following a business visit to Damascus in 1955. Shortly after, following family disagreement, he resigned his directorship with Mander Brothers.

Family
Charles Marcus Mander married Maria Dolores, daughter of Alfred Edmund Brödermann, a banker of Hamburg, on 24 November 1945, by whom he had three children:

(Charles) Nicholas (b. 23 March 1950).
Francis Peter (b. 4 December 1952). He married Georgina Thring (issue: two sons).
Penelope Anne Mary (b. 22 September 1946). She married firstly Michael Rollo Hoare, a partner in C. Hoare & Co., bankers (issue: two daughters), and secondly Simon Loder (issue: one son).

See also
Mander family
Mander Baronets
Mander Brothers

References

Sources

Sir Geoffrey Le Mesurier Mander (ed), The History of Mander Brothers (Wolverhampton, n.d. [1955])
Charles Nicholas Mander, Varnished Leaves: a biography of the Mander Family of Wolverhampton, 1750-1950 (Owlpen Press, 2004)
Mosley, Charles, editor, Burke's Peerage, Baronetage & Knightage, 107th edition, 3 volumes (Burke's Peerage (Genealogical Books) Ltd, 2003), volume 2, page 2589, sub Mander baronetcy of the Mount [U.K.], cr. 1911
Kidd, Charles (editor), Debrett's Peerage and Baronetage, Debrett’s, 2008, B 626-7
Who’s Who, A&C Black, various editions

External links 
Obituary, The Daily Telegraph, 25 August 2006
Brief Life, The Times, 5 October 2006
An Appreciation of Sir Charles Marcus Mander by Bev Parker
Brief history of the Mander family
Mander family genealogy
Mander Brothers
Express and Star obituary

1921 births
2006 deaths
People from Wolverhampton
Coldstream Guards officers
British Army personnel of World War II
People educated at Eton College
English Roman Catholics
Alumni of Trinity College, Cambridge
Baronets in the Baronetage of the United Kingdom
Converts to Roman Catholicism
High Sheriffs of Staffordshire